Earnshaw Cook (March 28, 1900 in Reisterstown, Maryland – November 11, 1987 in Baltimore, Maryland) was an early researcher and proponent of sabermetrics, the analysis of baseball through statistical means.

Engineering

A member of the Princeton University class of 1921, Cook was an engineer specializing in metallurgy. He spent most of his working life at the American Brake Shoe Co. in Mahwah, New Jersey, later consulting on the Manhattan Project before retiring from the industry in 1945. In the 1950s and 1960s, Cook worked as a mechanical engineering professor at Johns Hopkins University, where he published several academic papers.

Statistical baseball studies

Cook first set about his statistical baseball studies with the goal of proving that Ty Cobb, holder of the highest career batting average at .366, was better than Babe Ruth, the premier power hitter of the first half of the 20th century. Additionally Cook sought to understand strategical issues such as batting order and relief pitching, rather than accept the traditional strategies of baseball. Sports Illustrated writer Frank Deford learned of Cook's work and interviewed him for the lead story of a 1964 issue with the title "Baseball is Played All Wrong".  Using tools of the time, such as a slide rule and a Friden STW mechanical calculator, Earnshaw Cook published the culmination of his work, Percentage Baseball (MIT Press), in 1964. Percentage Baseball was the first book of baseball statistics studies to gain national media attention. Though Cook received some support from Los Angeles Dodgers manager Walter Alston and Chicago White Sox owner Bill Veeck, most baseball executives and managers rejected Cook's mathematical approach and academic language. He was also criticized for lax mathematical models and inadequate numerical evidence by statisticians, such as George Lindsey (himself a baseball statistician), who advised that it be "kept out of the sight of students of the theory of probability." Modern author Michael Lewis describes Cook's prose as "crafted to alienate [baseball statistics] converts."

Among Cook's most bold assertions was that, utilizing his strategies, a team could gain up to 250 runs a season, a number which modern methods indicate is an extreme overestimate. Years later, sabermetrician Pete Palmer and sports historian John Thorn asserted that their computer simulations using Cook's lineup modifications actually slightly reduce the number of runs a team scored. Bill James would later write in his 1981 Baseball Abstract that "Cook knew everything about statistics and nothing at all about baseball--and for that reasons, all of his answers are wrong, all of his methods useless." Earnshaw Cook also dismissed the effects of player handedness (thus, condemning the use of the platoon system), which even contemporary studies pointed out to be erroneous. Cook did, however, uncover several important pieces of information which are now accepted as common knowledge in modern sabermetrics, such as the inefficiency of the sacrifice bunt. More importantly, the material generated discussion on statistical analysis in baseball and introduced many baseball fans to objective research.  In 1971, Waverly Press published Cook's follow-up to Percentage Baseball titled Percentage Baseball and the Computer, in which Cook describes many pieces of strategy his computer simulations suggest.

Influence and legacy

Cook never worked for a Major League baseball team; he described the relationship between himself and baseball franchises in the forward to Percentage Baseball: "I would be willing to go as far as pretending to understand why none of four competent and successful executives of second-division ball clubs were most reluctant to employ probabilistic methods of any description... but they did not even want to hear about them!"  Though Cook himself was never hired by a Major League team, his work influenced Major League Baseball personnel such as Tal Smith, Ewing Kauffman and Davey Johnson, as well as future sabermetricians like Palmer.  Percentage Baseball also influenced Eric Walker, who worked for the San Francisco Giants and Sandy Alderson's Oakland Athletics.  Cook's slide rule, which he used during his research for Percentage Baseball, was donated upon request to the Baseball Hall of Fame. Prior to his death he had diminished eyesight and he and wife Elizabeth Cook collaborated with Johns Hopkins on  engineering  illuminated magnification glasses for reading and research.  His signature tie was a bow tie.  He engineered a unique golf putter for himself and applied his statistical and rare metal analysis to golf as well.  He had experience in the navy during WW1 and his roommate from College Larry Keyes and he  played baseball. Elizabeth Cook experienced college in England. Cook had no direct descendants. Earnshaw Cook died of a heart attack in 1987. Elizabeth Cook passed in 1996.

Philip Roth based the character of the kid genius baseball coach Isaac Ellis in The Great American Novel on Cook.

References

1987 deaths
Baseball statisticians
Johns Hopkins University faculty
1900 births
People from Reistertown, Maryland
20th-century American mathematicians